The Diocese of Laghouat is a Latin Church ecclesiastical jurisdiction or diocese of the Catholic Church covering the sparsely populated Saharan inland of Algeria.

It is immediately exempt to the Holy See and not part of any ecclesiastical province, and depends on the missionary Roman Congregation for the Evangelization of Peoples.

The bishops cathedra is found in the Pro-Cathedral of Ghardaïa in the episcopal see of Ghardaïa. The former cathedral is the now-deconsecrated church of Saint Hilarion, in the city of Laghouat.

History 
 Established on 19 July 1901 as Apostolic Prefecture of Ghardaïa on territory split off from the then Apostolic Vicariate of Sahara and Sudan (now the Archdiocese of Bamako in present Mali), also a pre-diocesan missionary jurisdiction.
 Renamed on 10 January 1921 as Apostolic Prefecture of Ghardaïa in the Sahara
 On 28 April 1942, it lost western territory to establish the then Apostolic Prefecture of Niamey (now an archdiocese)
 Promoted on 10 June 1948 as a apostolic vicariate, entitled to a titular bishop
 On 5 July 1954, it lost western territory to establish the then Apostolic Prefecture of Spanish Sahara and Ifni (now of Western Sahara)
 Promoted on 14 September 1955 as Diocese of Laghouat.

Statistics 
, it pastorally served 2,080 Catholics (0.0% of 4,902,760 total) on 2,107,708 km² in 10 parishes with 14 priests (3 diocesan, 11 religious) and 46 lay religious (20 brothers, 26 sisters) .

Ordinaries

Apostolic Prefects of Ghardaïa 
Cardinal Charles Lavigerie (apostolic administrator 13 March 1891 – 25 November 1892)
 Charles Guérin (1901–1910)
 Henry Bardou (1911–1916)
 Louis David (1916–1919)
 Gustave-Jean-Marie Nouet, MAfr (28 April 1919 – 10 January 1921); see below

Apostolic Prefects of Ghardaïa nel Sahara 
 Gustave-Jean-Marie Nouet, MAfr (10 January 1921 – 1941); see above
 Georges-Louis Mercier, MAfr (1941 – 10 June 1948); see below

Apostolic Vicar of Ghardaïa nel Sahara 
 Georges-Louis Mercier, MAfr (10 June 1948 – 14 September 1955); see above & below

Bishops of Laghouat 
 Georges-Louis Mercier, MAfr (14 September 1955 – 11 January 1968); see above
 Jean-Marie Michel Arthur Alix Zacharie Raimbaud, MAfr (11 January 1968 – 25 June 1989)
 Michel-Joseph-Gérard Gagnon, MAfr (4 February 199 – 11 June 2004)
Michel Larbubu, MAfr (apostolic administrator 29 April 2004 – 26 October 2004)
 Claude Jean Narcisse Rault, MAfr (26 October 2004 – 16 March 2017)
 John MacWilliam, MAfr (16 March 2017 – )

See also 
 List of Catholic dioceses in Algeria
 Roman Catholicism in Algeria

Sources and external links 

 GCatholic.org, with incumbent biography links - data for all sections
 Catholic Hierarchy
 Diocese of Laghouat Website (French)

Roman Catholic dioceses in Algeria
Christian organizations established in 1901
Roman Catholic dioceses and prelatures established in the 20th century